1948 Hong Kong–Shanghai Cup was the 21st staging of Hong Kong-Shanghai Cup and the last staging before the competition was halted for about 40 years. Hong Kong captured the champion by winning 5-1.

Result

References

1948 in association football
1947–48 in Hong Kong football
Hong Kong–Shanghai Cup
1948–49 in Hong Kong football